St Thomas School is a Roman Catholic school located in Kalyan east, India. It was established by the Diocese of Kalyan in 2000. It teaches in the partern of SSC BOARD.

School 
The school has four floors. Each floor has separate wash rooms and toilets. The school educates 1700 students at morning time and 1100 students at evening time.
The school has a computer lab, science laboratory, audio-visual rooms and a playground. This school has a Principal said to be Sister of school, Manager said to be Father of school.

Sports 
The school has a well sports facility for cricket, football, handball, volleyball, basketball, badminton, table tennis and dodge ball. This school started its sports competitions for the year 2009. So to make easy this school divided some students in house colours blue, red, yellow, green. Every year competitions are held. In these competitions basketball is more interesting and almost all the students enjoy it.

Programs 
This school organises annual day, cultural week competitions, independence and republic day, sports day and many more occasions.

References

External links 
 
 Official school Facebook page

Catholic schools in India
Christian schools in Maharashtra
Schools in Thane district
Education in Kalyan-Dombivli
Educational institutions established in 2000
2000 establishments in Maharashtra